= Countryside La Vie =

British magazine

- Issue 97 Cover / December 2013
- Editor: Sue Brindley
- Categories: Lifestyle Property
- Frequency: Bi-Monthly
- Founded: 1993
- Company: Ryans Holdings Ltd
- Country: United Kingdom
- Based in: Leicester
- Language: British English
- Website: countryside-lavie.com^{[usurped]}
- ISSN: 1350-7850

Countryside La Vie Magazine is a British regional bi-monthly magazine, distributed throughout Leicestershire and Rutland.

== History ==
Countryside La Vie was launched in 1993 as a property and lifestyle magazine. The magazine was the brainchild of a small family group wanting to concentrate on promoting local charitable organisations in and around Leicestershire.

Over the last 20 years the magazine has evolved and encompasses every aspect of Leicestershire life, whilst including world and celebrity news.

=== Editors ===
- Marlene Bowley (1993 - 2006)
- Sue Brindley (2006–Present)
